Bastien Duhalde is a French professional rugby union player. He plays at scrum-half for Bayonne in the Top 14.

References

External links
European Professional Club Rugby Profile
Ligue Nationale De Rugby Profile
Bayonne Profile

Living people
1993 births
French rugby union players
Rugby union scrum-halves